Wesley P. Chesbro (born August 20, 1951) is an American Democratic politician from California. He was an assemblymember for the 2nd district, encompassing the North Coast. Previously, Chesbro served as the Assembly member from California's 1st district from 2008 until 2012. He has also served as a member of the California Integrated Waste Management Board.

Early career 
Chesbro was an early leader in the recycling movement having founded the Arcata Recycling Center in 1971. The Arcata Recycling Center is one of California's oldest and most successful recycling operations. He has also served as a Humboldt County Supervisor and an Arcata city councilmember.

Post Senate Career
Chesbro was term-limited in 2006 and was replaced by Pat Wiggins. On January 5, 2007, Chesbro was appointed by the California State Senate Rules Committee to serve again on the California Integrated Waste Management Board. On January 12, 2007, State Superintendent of Public Instruction Jack O'Connell announced the appointment of Chesbro to the California Mental Health Services Oversight and Accountability Commission.

2008 assembly election 
On February 8, 2008, Chesbro announced he would run in the November 2008 election to replace term-limited Patty Berg in California's 1st assembly district.  He was successful, winning with 70.5% of the vote over Republican Jim Pell.

References

1951 births
Methodists from California
County supervisors in California
California state senators
Living people
Members of the California State Assembly
People from Arcata, California
Politicians from Los Angeles
University of San Francisco alumni
21st-century American politicians